The 1964–65 Athenian League season was the 42nd in the history of Athenian League. The league consisted of 48 teams.

Premier Division

The division featured 3 new teams, all promoted from last season's Division One:
 Leatherhead  (1st)
 Worthing (2nd)
 Edgware Town (3rd)

League table

Division One

The division featured 5 new teams, all promoted from last season's Division Two:
 Tilbury  (1st)
 Harrow Town (2nd)
 Harlow Town (3rd)
 Hertford Town (4th)
 Hemel Hempstead Town (5th)

League table

Division Two

The division joined 6 new teams:
 Harwich & Parkeston, from Eastern Counties League
 Croydon Amateurs, from Spartan League
 Herne Bay, from Aetolian League
 Eastbourne United, from Metropolitan League
 Cheshunt, from Spartan League
 Rainham Town, from Metropolitan League

League table

References

1964–65 in English football leagues
Athenian League